A Queen of Denmark is a female Danish monarch.

Queen of Denmark may also refer to:

 Queen consort of Denmark, the wife of a reigning King of Denmark
 Queen of Denmark (album), a 2010 album by John Grant
 "Queen of Denmark", song from the above album, covered by Sinéad O'Connor on her 2012 album How About I Be Me (and You Be You)?